Me Voy (English: I'm Leaving) may refer to:

"Me Voy" (Gloria Estefan song)
"Me Voy" (Jesse & Joy song)
"Me Voy" (Julieta Venegas song)
"Me Voy" (Paulina Rubio song)
"Me Voy", a song by Camila, included on their album Dejarte de Amar (2010)
"Me Voy", a song by RBD, Spanish language cover of Kelly Clarkson's "Gone", included on their album Nuestro Amor 
"Me Voy", 2006 song by Héctor Acosta

See also
"Hoy Me Voy", a song by Juanes from the album La Vida... Es Un Ratico (2007)
"Hoy Ya Me Voy", a song by Kany García from the album Cualquier Día (2007)